Ives Antero De Souza (born June 11, 1985 in Rio de Janeiro), known as Ives, is a Brazilian footballer, currently under contract for side Potiguar de Mossoró. He is 1.73 metres tall and weighs 72 kilograms.

References

External links
 fcprogresul.ro  
 
 

1985 births
Living people
Brazilian footballers
Brazilian expatriate footballers
Association football midfielders
Expatriate footballers in Romania
Campeonato Brasileiro Série A players
Campeonato Brasileiro Série B players
Campeonato Brasileiro Série C players
CR Vasco da Gama players
Duque de Caxias Futebol Clube players
Clube Náutico Capibaribe players
Volta Redonda FC players
FC Progresul București players
Mesquita Futebol Clube players
CR Flamengo footballers
Rio Branco Sport Club players
Paraná Clube players
America Football Club (RJ) players
Bangu Atlético Clube players
Madureira Esporte Clube players
América Futebol Clube (RN) players
Audax Rio de Janeiro Esporte Clube players
Atlético Rio Negro Clube players
Footballers from Rio de Janeiro (city)